Hot Country Songs is a chart that ranks the top-performing country music songs in the United States, published by Billboard magazine.  In 2011, 34 different songs topped the chart in 52 issues of the magazine, based on weekly airplay data from country music radio stations compiled by Nielsen Broadcast Data Systems.

In the issue dated January 1, Reba McEntire (credited for this release simply as Reba), moved to number one with "Turn On the Radio", replacing "Why Wait" by Rascal Flatts, which had held the top spot since the issue of Billboard dated December 18, 2010.  It was the 25th number-one country single of McEntire's career, tying the record for the highest number of chart-toppers by a female artist held by Dolly Parton.  Blake Shelton spent the most weeks in the top spot in 2011, with eight, and his song "Honey Bee" had the longest run at the top by an individual song, spending four weeks in the top spot. Shelton was one of two acts to reach the top spot with three different songs, the other being Zac Brown Band.  Jason Aldean, Kenny Chesney, Lady Antebellum, Brad Paisley and Chris Young each had two number ones.  Paisley's two chart-toppers were both collaborations, one with Carrie Underwood and one with the band Alabama.  Their appearance on the song "Old Alabama" gave the namesake band their first number one for 18 years.  Sara Evans gained her first number one single since 2005 with "A Little Bit Stronger", and was the only female solo artist to have a multi-week number one single during the year.

Four acts topped the chart for the first time in 2011.  The first was the duo Thompson Square, who spent a single week at number one in April with "Are You Gonna Kiss Me or Not".  In September, Jake Owen reached number one for the first time with "Barefoot Blue Jean Night", followed in November by "Crazy Girl" by Eli Young Band.  Although it only spent a single week at the top, "Crazy Girl" was ranked number one on Billboard's year-end chart of the most popular country songs.  The final act to reach number one for the first time was Brantley Gilbert, whose song "Country Must Be Country Wide" topped the chart for one week in December.  The final number one of the year was "Keep Me in Mind" by Zac Brown Band.

Chart history

Footnotes

See also
2011 in music
List of artists who reached number one on the U.S. country chart

References

2011
Number-one country singles
United States Country Singles